The 2010–11 season was Manchester City Football Club's 109th season of competitive football, 82nd season in the top flight of English football and 14th season in the Premier League. As City finished fifth in previous season's league campaign, they qualified for the recently rebranded UEFA Europa League. The Blues were managed by Roberto Mancini, who had been appointed midway through the previous season.

The season is best remembered by City's title run in the FA Cup, which saw them defeat rivals Manchester United in the semi-finals before overcoming Stoke City in the final, both by a 1–0 scoreline. The triumph ended Manchester City's 35-year wait for the silverware and signified the start of a new are under the CFG ownership. The season was also notable due to the club finishing third in the Premier League and qualifying for next season's UEFA Champions League, something that had not happened since 1967–68, when the Blues qualified for the old European Cup via their league title victory.

Season review

In the summer transfer window, the club, one of the richest in the world since its 2008 takeover by the Abu Dhabi United Group, spent £126 million on players, including Jérôme Boateng from Hamburger SV, Yaya Touré from Barcelona, David Silva from Valencia, Aleksandar Kolarov from Lazio, Mario Balotelli from Inter Milan and James Milner from Aston Villa. Popular City midfielder Stephen Ireland was transferred to Aston Villa as part of a player exchange agreement in the Milner deal.

The team began this season's campaign well, collecting four out of a possible six points against Top 7 opponents Tottenham Hotspur and Liverpool, which was three points more than City managed in the comparable fixtures last season. The Blues then stuttered for a couple of games against Sunderland (away) and Blackburn Rovers (at home), bagging only a single home point out of the six despite completely dominating both games, with (according to manager Roberto Mancini) at least 25 missed chances in the Blackburn game alone. City got itself back on a winning track again with a 0–2 away win against Wigan Athletic, which was the first time the team had ever won at the DW Stadium, breaking what some supporters had labelled a jinx for this fixture.

After the previous season's run to the semi-finals of the League Cup, the team's performance in that competition this season was very disappointing, with the Blues falling at the first hurdle, losing 2–1 to West Bromwich Albion in the third round tie played at The Hawthorns.

City began its Europa League campaign in much better style, clocking up three back-to-back wins in its first three games. In the first leg 1–0 away victory over Timișoara in the play-off round, Mario Balotelli scored the single winning goal on his debut, but also incurred a serious knee injury that required surgery, putting him out of action for the next three months. Balotelli was not the only one of City's new crop of high-profile summer signings to fall victim to an early serious injury, with Jérôme Boateng missing out on the first six weeks of the new season due to a knee injury he picked up playing for Germany in an international friendly match against Denmark back in mid-August, while Aleksandar Kolarov seriously damaged his ankle ligaments in the opening match of the season against Tottenham Hotspur. The loss of Boateng and Kolarov – taken together with recent injuries to Micah Richards (hamstring), Wayne Bridge (thigh injury coming right on the back of a prolonged absence due to a cracked foot bone) and Joleon Lescott (groin) – meant that Roberto Mancini found himself without five of his eight main back four defenders going into City's home match against Chelsea, causing him to claim that he had a defensive injury crisis for that game, which nevertheless City still managed to win convincingly due to a stellar defensive performance from the back four (Dedryck Boyata, Kolo Touré, Vincent Kompany and Pablo Zabaleta) that Mancini was able to field.

Kits
Supplier: Umbro / Sponsor: Etihad Airways

Kit information
Umbro made a new set of kits for Manchester City whilst they were in their second year of contract with the club.

 Home: The home kit was in City's traditional colours of sky blue and white in a classic design modelled on the club's outfits worn in the late 1960s. Featuring white cuffs and subtle shadow stripes on the body, the home strip was kitted out with white shorts and sky blue socks, which had a maroon turnover on the top.
 Away: The away kit was mainly navy with sky blue detailing and sported thin horizontal sky blue striping on the socks. The kit was described on the club's website as the "dark side of the moon".
 Third: The white third kit last season was retained, but was refitted with white shorts and socks, the latter sporting a red-and-black band to echo the sash on the body.
 Keeper: The last season goalkeeper kits were also retained, though a new all-black kit had been added to the collection for this season, to be used primarily with the home team kit. Last season's all-green home goalkeeper strip had been moved over to the away kit, although it was still used with the home team kit when the all-black kit was considered to be too close in colour to the opposition's strip (e.g., Chelsea and Newcastle United). The gold-and-black goalkeeper strip that was used primarily with the away kit last season had been retained as an alternate (third) choice kit for the goalkeepers. As could be determined from the foregoing, which of the three team kits these goalkeeper strips were actually used with was not a hard and fast rule since any of these strips could be swapped around (if necessary) in order to avoid kit clashes with the opponents' team strips or the opponents' goalkeeper strips, as well as avoiding clashes with the strips worn by the match officials.

On 2 February 2011, there was a minor "kit faux pas" when the Manchester City team wore its regular home team kit for its away fixture against Birmingham City at St Andrew's, a fixture that usually required the visiting Manchester City team to use one of its alternative strips (in this case, its third team kit since the midnight blue away kit also represented a colour clash), as the primary home team colours of both sides combined a blue shirt with white shorts. No explanation had ever come as to why this mix-up occurred (because as per which kits were to be worn in which fixtures was determined before the season even began), or why the referee, Kevin Friend, allowed two teams so similarly clad onto the pitch rather than insist that one of them first change its kit, although Birmingham's 2010–11 home shirt features large elements of white. Since then, there have been multiple instances of City wearing sky blue against teams in royal blue.

Pre-season games
Friendly

New York Football Challenge

Atlanta International Soccer Challenge

Pirelli Cup

Ferrostaal Cup, Summer of Champions

Friendly

Competitions

Premier League

League table

Results summary

Points breakdown

Points at home: 43 
Points away from home: 28 

Points against 2009/10 Top Four: 9 
Points against promoted teams: 18

6 points: Blackpool, Bolton Wanderers, Newcastle United, West Bromwich Albion,
West Ham United, Wigan Athletic
4 points: Blackburn Rovers, Fulham, Stoke City, Tottenham Hotspur
3 points: Aston Villa, Chelsea, Liverpool, Sunderland, Wolverhampton Wanderers
2 points: Birmingham City
1 point: Arsenal, Manchester United
0 points: Everton

Biggest & smallest
Biggest home win: 5–0 vs. Sunderland, 3 April 2011 
Biggest home defeat: 0–3 vs. Arsenal, 24 October 2010 
Biggest away win: 1–4 vs. Fulham, November 2010 
Biggest away defeat: 3–0 vs. Liverpool, 11 April 2011

Biggest home attendance: 47,393 vs. Arsenal, 24 October 2010 
Smallest home attendance: 43,077 vs. Fulham, 27 February 2011 
Biggest away attendance: 75,322 vs. Manchester United, 12 February 2011 
Smallest away attendance: 15,525 vs. Wigan Athletic, 19 September 2010

Results by round

Matches

FA Cup

League Cup

UEFA Europa League

Play-off round

Group stage

Knockout phase

Round of 32

Round of 16

Squad information

Playing statistics
Appearances (Apps) numbers are for appearances in competitive games only, including sub appearances.
Red card numbers denote: numbers in parentheses represent red cards overturned for wrongful dismissal.

Goalscorers
Includes all competitive matches. The list is sorted alphabetically by surname when total goals are equal.

Awards

Premier League Manager of the Month award
Awarded monthly to the manager that was chosen by a panel assembled by the Premier League's sponsor.

Premier League Golden Boot award
Awarded to the player who scored the most goals in the 2010–11 Premier League season.

(*shared with Manchester United's Dimitar Berbatov)

Barclays Golden Glove award
Awarded to the goalkeeper who kept the most clean sheets over the 2010–11 Premier League season.

PFA Team of the Year
The combined best 11 from all teams in the Premier League chosen by the PFA.

Etihad / OSC Player of the Year awards

Etihad Player of the Month awards
Awarded to the player that receives the most votes in a poll conducted each month on the official website of Manchester City.

Tuttosport Golden Boy award
Awarded annually since 2003 by the Italian daily sports newspaper to the young player (on an initial short list of 40 'under 21' players) that receives the most votes from a panel consisting of 30 sports journalists selected from across the whole of Europe.

Best Groundsmen of the Year award
Awarded annually at a meeting of the Institute of Groundsmanship organisation as a result of voting by professional football grounds management teams from the whole of the UK.

Transfers and loans

Transfers in

Transfers out

Loans out

This 'loan watch' report provided the latest progress update on most of the players listed above that were out on loan at other clubs.

References

2010–11
2010–11
Manchester City